Sham Shui Po District is one of 18 districts of Hong Kong. It is the poorest district in Hong Kong, with a predominantly working-class population of 405,869 in 2016 and the lowest median household income of all districts. Sham Shui Po has long been home to poorer new immigrants from mainland China. It also saw the birth of public housing in Hong Kong, as the government sought to resettle those displaced by a devastating fire in its slums. Sham Shui Po also hosted a Vietnamese refugee camp during the influx of migration in the aftermath of the Vietnam War.

The district covers the Shek Kip Mei, Sham Shui Po, Cheung Sha Wan, Lai Chi Kok, Kowloon Tsai, So Uk,  and Yau Yat Chuen areas of New Kowloon, and Stonecutters Island of Kowloon.

Administration
Sham Shui Po District administers:
Cheung Sha Wan 長沙灣 – Between Tonkin Street and Kom Tsun Street/Butterfly Valley Road.
 MTR stations: Cheung Sha Wan station, Lai Chi Kok station
Western Part of Kowloon Tong 九龍塘 – West of the route of East Rail line, north of Boundary Street and east of Tai Hang Tung Road, where Yau Yat Tsuen 又一村 and Tai Hang Tung Estate are situated.
 MTR station: Kowloon Tong station (East Rail)
Lai Chi Kok 荔枝角 – West of Kom Tsun Street/Butterfly Valley Road to east of Lai King, Kwai Chung.
 MTR station: Mei Foo station
Sham Shui Po 深水埗 – Between Tonkin Street and Boundary Street
 MTR stations: Sham Shui Po station, Nam Cheong station
Shek Kip Mei 石硤尾 – East of Tai Po Road, North of Boundary Street, west of Tai Hang Tung Road, where Eastern part of Kowloon Tsai (Nam Shan Estate) is situated.
 MTR station: Shek Kip Mei station
So Uk 蘇屋 – Between Po on Road and Ching Cheung Road/Tai Po Road.
Stonecutters Island 昂船洲 – Excluding the reclaimed lands for Container Terminal 8 which is located in north of Hing Wah Street West and Ngong Shuen Chau Viaduct.

Demographics and housing

Sham Shui Po was already a densely populated district in the 1950s and 1960s. It is poverty-stricken, having the lowest median monthly domestic household income among the 18 districts. It has the highest percentage of elderly people over 65 years. The percentage of new immigrants is also very high. Living conditions of grass-roots families in this district remain a social issue.

Mei Foo Sun Chuen in Lai Chi Kok, built in 1968 - 1978, was Hong Kong's first large-scale private housing estate. It comprises eight phases with a total of 99 blocks.

Public Housing

There are 18 public housing estates in the Sham Shui Po District, divided into sub-districts:

Cheung Sha Wan
Cheung Sha Wan Estate
Fortune Estate
Hoi Lai Estate
Hoi Ying Estate
Lai Tsui Court
Lei Cheng Uk Estate
So Uk Estate
Un Chau Estate
Sham Shui Po
Cronin Garden
Fu Cheong Estate
Lai Kok Estate
Lai On Estate
Nam Cheong Estate
Wing Cheong Estate
Shek Kip Mei
Chak On Estate
Nam Shan Estate
Pak Tin Estate
Shek Kip Mei Estate
Tai Hang Tung Estate
Tai Hang Sai Estate

Education

The main campus of City University of Hong Kong, was located in Tat Chee Avenue, Sham Shui Po District.

Transport
There are four railway lines serving Sham Shui Po District:

MTR

 Kwun Tong line: Shek Kip Mei
 Tsuen Wan line: Sham Shui Po, Cheung Sha Wan, Lai Chi Kok, Mei Foo.
 Tung Chung line: Nam Cheong.
 Tuen Ma line: Mei Foo, Nam Cheong.

Buses
There are also various bus routes serving the district. Most of them are operated by Kowloon Motor Bus, and some by New World First Bus and Citybus. These three companies also jointly operate some routes, most of these crossing the harbour to the Hong Kong Island.
Kowloon Motor Bus: 2, 2A, 2B, 2D, 2E, 2F, 2X, 6, 6C, 6D, 6F, 6X, 12, 12A, 12P, 13P, 18, 30, 30X, 31B, 32, 33, 33A, 33B, 35A, 35X, 36A, 36B, 36X, 37, 38, 38A, 38P, 40, 40A, 40P, 41, 42, 42A, 42C, 43C, 44, 45, 46, 46X, 52X, 58X, 59X, 60X, 61X, 62P, 62X, 63X, 66X, 67X, 68X, 69C, 69X, 72, 81, 86, 86A, 86C, 87B, 87D, 87E, 98C, 98S, 203C, 203S, 214, 214P, 230X, 234C, 234D, 234X, 238X, 240X, 242X, 252X, 258A, 258D, 258P, 258S, 259C, 259D, 265B, 268A, 268C, 269C, 270B, 270D, 272E, 272P, 281A, 286C, 286P, 286X, 290, 290A, 290B,  290X, 296C, 296P, N214, N273, N241, N252, N260, N269, N290, X6C, X42C
New World First Bus: 701, 701A, 701S, 702, 702A, 702B, 702S, 795P, 795X, 796C, 796E
Citybus: 50, 55, 79X, A20, A21, A26, A26P, A29, A29P, E21, E21A, E21C, E22, E22A, E22C, E22P, E22S, E22X, N21, N21A, N26, N29, NA20, NA29
Cross Harbour Tunnel: 102, 102P, 102R, 104, 112, 117, 118, 118P, 171, 171A, 171P, 904, 905, 905A, 905P, 914, 914P, 914X, 936, 936A, 970, 970X, 971, N118, N122, N171, N368, X970

See also
 Politics of Hong Kong
 Sham Shui Po SA

References

External links

 Sham Shui Po District Council
 List and map of electoral constituencies

 
Kowloon
New Kowloon
Sham Shui Po